Siverino A. "Nonoy" Baclao Jr. (born June 15, 1987) is a Filipino professional basketball player for the Meralco Bolts of the Philippine Basketball Association (PBA). A forward, he played three seasons for the Ateneo de Manila Blue Eagles in the University Athletic Association of the Philippines from 2007 to 2009 and led the Eagles to back-to-back basketball championships in his last two seasons with them. He also played for the Philippine Patriots in the ASEAN Basketball League and led the team as the inaugural champion of the 2009-10 ABL season.

College career
Baclao attended high school and the first few years of college at the West Negros University, where he led the WNU Mustangs to the 2005 National University Games (Unigames) crown in Bacolod City and the 2006 Basketball Association of the Philippines (BAP) National Students Championship (Inter-Collegiate) title. His reputation as a major defensive contributor, especially in blocking and rebounding, was noticed by Manila-based college scouts, and in 2006 he was recruited by Ateneo de Manila University, which was led by Japeth Aguilar and Chris Tiu among others.

After serving the mandatory one-year residency rule imposed by the University Athletic Association of the Philippines, Baclao made it to the Blue Eagles roster in the 2007 UAAP season, where he contributed to the team's defense, although they failed to make it to the Finals. In 2008, he was designated as the team's co-captain, which he held until his last year of eligibility. In those last two seasons, Baclao averaged 6.1 points per game, 5.9 rebounds per game, and 1.9 blocks per game. He played a major role in the Blue Eagles' conquest of their archrivals, the De La Salle Green Archers in the 2008 UAAP Basketball championships. He was adjudged as the Finals MVP and the Smart Defensive Player of the Year.

In his final UAAP season, where Baclao shared the captaincy with Jai Reyes and Rabeh Al-Hussaini, he averaged 6.4 points per game, 8.4 rebounds per game, 2.5 blocks per game, and 1.4 assists per game in 27.9 minutes per game, and was a key factor in the Eagles' defense of the UAAP title against the University of the East Red Warriors.

Professional career
Weeks after leading the Eagles to its second straight UAAP basketball championship, Baclao signed with the Philippine Patriots, the country's professional team playing for the ASEAN Basketball League. Coach Louie Alas saw him reprising his role he had with the Blue Eagles as he backstopped the team's defense.  To date, Baclao's superb clutch plays off the bench has helped the Patriots win games, especially their rematch against the Singapore Slingers in Manila on November 7, 2009, where they won, 70–53.

He became the top pick of the 2010 PBA Draft, a draft class that featured fellow Blue Eagle Rabeh Al-Hussaini, Letran swingman Rey Guevarra and Sean Anthony. He immediately made impact with his first team providing solid defense. However, his performance was not as stellar as that of Al-Hussaini. Still, he was awarded as a member of the All-Rookie Team by season's end. On his second year, his minutes went down and was seldom used by the Boosters. During the 2012 off-season, he, along with Niño Canaleta, Robert Reyes and John Wilson were traded to the Air21 Express. Under Franz Pumaren, his play became better and is now among the regularly used players on the team. He was again traded on October 13, 2013 in a three-team trade that involved Air21, Talk 'N Text, and Meralco. On September 22, 2014 Baclao and Harold Arboleda were traded to GlobalPort for Jay Washington. This trade is a part of a multiple team trade between GlobalPort, Talk 'N Text, and NLEX.

On March 14, 2015, Globalport traded him and a 2017 first round draft pick to the Alaska Aces in exchange for Gabby Espinas.

PBA career statistics

As of the end of 2021 season

Season-by-season averages

|-
| align=left rowspan=2| 
| align=left | Air21
| rowspan=2|35 || rowspan=2|18.5 || rowspan=2|.441 || rowspan=2|.000 || rowspan=2|.677 || rowspan=2|5.2 || rowspan=2|1.1 || rowspan=2|.2 || rowspan=2|1.5 || rowspan=2|3.4
|-
| align=left | San Miguel / Petron
|- 
| align=left | 
| align=left | Petron
| 28 || 10.6 || .474 || .000 || .429 || 3.1 || .3 || .2 || .7 || 2.0
|-
| align=left rowspan=2| 
| align=left | Air21
| rowspan=2|31 || rowspan=2|16.1 || rowspan=2|.446 || rowspan=2|.000 || rowspan=2|.680 || rowspan=2|3.2 || rowspan=2|.8 || rowspan=2|.2 || rowspan=2|.7 || rowspan=2|3.7
|-
| align=left | Meralco
|- 
| align=left | 
| align=left | Talk 'N Text
| 41 || 13.4 || .360 || .333 || .759 || 3.7 || .6 || .4 || .8 || 2.6
|-
| align=left rowspan=2| 
| align=left | GlobalPort
| rowspan=2|28 || rowspan=2|12.1 || rowspan=2|.455 || rowspan=2|.000 || rowspan=2|.462 || rowspan=2|2.9 || rowspan=2|.3 || rowspan=2|.1 || rowspan=2|.6 || rowspan=2|2.0
|-
| align=left | Alaska
|- 
| align=left | 
| align=left | Alaska
| 52 || 14.8 || .473 || .000 || .667 || 2.5 || .5 || .4 || .5 || 3.2
|-
| align=left | 
| align=left | Alaska
| 12 || 15.1 || .524 || .000 || .667 || 4.0 || 1.1 || .3 || 1.3 || 4.2
|-
| align=left | 
| align=left | Alaska
| 44 || 16.7 || .463 || .000 || .500 || 3.8 || 1.0 || .3 || .8 || 3.7
|-
| align=left | 
| align=left | Alaska
| 21 || 18.1 || .418 || .111 || .471 || 4.2 || .9 || .5 || .9 || 3.1
|-
| align=left | 
| align=left | Meralco
| 21 || 8.4 || .474 || .429 || .750 || .5 || .2 || .0 || .2 || 2.0
|-class=sortbottom
| align=center colspan=2 | Career
| 313 || 14.6 || .447 || .152 || .623 || 3.3 || .7 || .3 || .8 || 3.0

Career highlights and awards
 UAAP Season 71 Finals Most Valuable Player
 UAAP Season 71 Smart Defensive Player

References

1987 births
Living people
Air21 Express players
Alaska Aces (PBA) players
Barako Bull Energy players
Basketball players from Negros Occidental
Centers (basketball)
Filipino men's basketball players
NorthPort Batang Pier players
Philippine Patriots players
Power forwards (basketball)
San Miguel Beermen players
Sportspeople from Bacolod
TNT Tropang Giga players
Ateneo Blue Eagles men's basketball players
Hiligaynon people
Barako Bull Energy draft picks